Jump City: Seattle was an American television series that formerly aired on G4 in 2011. It featured four of the top freerunning and parkour teams in the United States participating in a parkour competition. Each week, the athletes competed in different parkour challenges spread out across the streets of Seattle. The series ran for eight episodes and was not renewed for a second season. Team Tempest, led by Levi Meeuwenberg and Brian Orosco of American Ninja Warrior fame, won the competition.

Background
Jump City: Seattle was promoted as the first American championship parkour competition. It was hosted by G4 correspondent Blair Herter and Parkour veteran Brady Romberg. Filming of the show was based in Seattle, and the show was produced by Fremantle Media, North America. The series premiere aired on February 15, 2011 with the season finale episode airing on April 5, 2011.

The show follows four teams participating in the Pro Parkour League (PPL), which was created specifically for the show. Four locations were used for the competition: Seattle City Hall, Freeway Park, Pioneer Square, Seattle Center, and Qwest Field.

After the show aired, several athletes competed in the subsequent season of American Ninja Warrior, which then aired on G4. One of the show's participants, David "Young Flip" Rodriguez, remain a top competitor to this day.

Format
Each episode featured two of the four teams competing in a parkour "match", which consisted of two rounds: the Speed round and the Freestyle round. Should the teams split the two rounds, a sudden death tiebreaker would be used.

During the Pro Parkour League regular season, the four teams competed in a round-robin format, with the second and third placed teams competing in the semifinal match for the right to face the first place team in the Championship match at Qwest Field.

Speed Round
Three of the four members of the team participated in a relay race through a pre-determined set of parkour obstacles. Each leg of the relay had several "fly zones"; the competitors were required to touch every "fly zone" in their leg but were allowed to use any means by which to reach them. The team would incur a five-second penalty for each missed "fly zone". The team that completed the course the fastest, after penalties, won the round.

Freestyle Round
Three of the four members of the team received 45 seconds each to perform a freestyle parkour routine, utilizing anything in the area. After their run, competitors were judged on a scale of 1 to 10. Judging consisted of three elements:
 Creativity – how the competitors move through the obstacles in their run. They must show off a wide variety of moves and incorporate them in as much of the course as possible.
  Difficulty – the complexity of their moves.
 Execution – when performing a trick, competitors must stay in control, stick their landings, and connect all their moves together to create a flow (transition from one move to the next seamlessly).
The team with the higher sum of their three scores won the round.

Sudden Death
Should a sudden death tiebreaker be required, one member of each team would perform another parkour routine, this time lasting just 30 seconds. Judging worked the same as the freestyle round. The team with the higher score was declared the winner.

Teams

Team Tempest
Based in Los Angeles, Tempest Freerunning was founded in 2007. Many of the team's members work as stuntmen in Hollywood.

Miami Freerunning
Miami Freerunning emanates from Miami, Florida. The team members met in 2008. In order to become an official member, they have a ritual of being shot with a stun gun.

The Tribe
Founded in Washington, D.C., Tribe is America's first parkour team,. As Tribe founder Michael Zernow says, "This is art. This is physicality. This is being able to take your life into your own hands, so it wouldn't just be about kids on YouTube doing crazy stuff."

Team Rogue
Team Rogue was specifically created for the show with the intent on highlighting up-and-coming freerunners.

Episodes

Regular Season Matches

Week 1: Tempest vs. Rogue

 * The competition was moved from City Hall to Freeway Park in the middle of the Freestyle Round because of rain.
 * A five-second penalty was imposed on Rogue when Sarvas missed a "fly zone" on the course.

Week 2: Tribe vs. Miami Freerunning

 * David Rodriguez removed himself from the freestyle round after suffering a leg injury in the speed round. Reserve, Jared Woods, replaced him.

Week 3: Rogue vs. Tribe

 * A five-second penalty was imposed on Rogue when Smith missed a "fly zone" on the course.

Week 4: Tempest vs. Miami Freerunning

 *Levi Meeuwenberg was forced out of the competition after injuring his left wrist while practicing on an elevated bar for the speed round. Later, it was revealed by a medic that he fractured his wrist and would be out the entire season. (Although commonly cited as the injury that kept him out of Sasuke 26, this was a separate injury.) Reserve player Caine Sinclair would take Meeuwenberg's place for the rest of the season. On another note Sinclair had come in with a broken toe on his left foot and injured his right ankle in the speed round.

Week 5: Tempest vs. Tribe

 *Caine Sinclair competed with an injury—a broken toe on his left foot that he injured before the season began. He suffered through that and also "tweaked" his ankle in week 4.
 *Perhaps from nerves, Sanders threw up before the speed round, but still managed to compete.

Week 6: Rogue vs. Miami Freerunning 

 *Drew Drechsel competed with an injury to his toe popping out on his right foot that he injured during the speed round, but remained in the freestyle round.

Playoffs

Week 7: Tribe vs. Rogue

NOTE: The course was entirely changed from its Week 1 set-up so as not to give Team Rogue an advantage.

Week 8: Tempest vs. Tribe (Championship Match)

Season standings

Regular season
(After 6 Matches/Week 6)

(C) = Championship Berth / (X) = Eliminated / * = Eliminated in the play-offs

Championship Match

 *Team Tempest is the first ever Pro Parkour League (PPL) champions.

See also
American Ninja Challenge
American Ninja Warrior
Sasuke (TV series)
Ultimate Parkour Challenge

References

External links
 Jump City page on G4TV.com

G4 (American TV network) original programming
Parkour
Sports entertainment
2011 American television series debuts